Nik Fackler is an American filmmaker and musician. His 2008 romantic drama film Lovely, Still was nominated for a 2010 Independent Spirit Award for Best First Screenplay. His second film was an experimental documentary film, Sick Birds Die Easy (2012). Fackler is also a founding member, singer, and multi-instrumentalists of the electropop band Icky Blossoms.

References

External links

Year of birth missing (living people)
Living people
American filmmakers
American synth-pop musicians
American multi-instrumentalists